Son of India is a 2022 Indian Telugu-language action drama film written and directed by Diamond Ratnababu, and produced by Vishnu Manchu under the banner of Sree Lakshmi Prasanna Pictures and 24 Frames Factory. The film stars Mohan Babu, Meena, Srikanth, and Pragya Jaiswal. The film was released theatrically on 18 February 2022 to a highly negative reception and was box-office bomb.

Plot 
The story about a typical person (Mohan Babu). Mohan Babu introduction starts with the much hyped song “Jai Jai Mahaveera Maha Dheera”. Sunil, Ali and Vennela Kishore are reporters who confirm that minister (Srikanth) is kidnapped when he was planning to go to Tirumala.

Cast

Music 
The first single, a devotional song, composed by Ilaiyaraaja was released on 15 June, 2021.

Production and release
The film began its production in October 2020 in Hyderabad. Initially the makers wanted to finalize the deal with an OTT platform but it did not materialize. The film was then released on 18 February 2022 with a pre-release event held at Hyderabad.

Critical reception 
The film received mixed reviews from critics. A reviewer from Eenadu reviewed the film and called it Mohan Babu's "one man show". 123Telugu rated the movie with 2.25/5. Surya Prakash from Asianet News gave 2/5 rating and wrote Mohan Babu did an experiment at this age with the movie. Thadhagath Pathi of The Times of India gave the film a rating of 1.5 out of 5 and wrote "Son of India has a short run-time but the film feels stretched despite that. It’s not a theatrical experience everyone is longing for".

Pinkvilla gave the film 1.5 out of 5 an wrote "'Son Of India' has been made to feel like an ode to Mohan Babu's illustrious career. Most of the actors, for almost three-fourths of the film, are either unseen from the front, or their faces are relentlessly blurred on the pretext of letting the lead man do mono-action". Sangeetha Devi Dundoo of The Hindu stated "An amateurish narration of an outdated story makes ‘Son of India’ an excruciating watch".

References

External links

2020s Telugu-language films
Films scored by Ilaiyaraaja
2022 films
2022 action drama films
Indian action drama films
Films shot in Hyderabad, India